Marcin Kaczmarek (born 25 June 1977 in Pisz, Warmińsko-Mazurskie) is a retired butterfly swimmer from Poland, who competed for his native country at the 2000 Summer Olympics in Sydney, Australia.

A member of AZS-AWF Gdańsk he is best known for winning the bronze medal at the 1997 European Swimming Championships in the men's 4×100 m medley relay, alongside Mariusz Siembida, Marek Krawczyk and Bartosz Kizierowski.

References
sports-reference

1977 births
Living people
Polish male butterfly swimmers
Olympic swimmers of Poland
Swimmers at the 2000 Summer Olympics
People from Pisz
European Aquatics Championships medalists in swimming
Sportspeople from Warmian-Masurian Voivodeship
21st-century Polish people